Yeremkino (Yärämkä) is a rural locality (a selo) in Dyurtyulinsky Selsoviet, Sharansky District, Bashkortostan, Russia. The population was 292 as of 2010. There are 5 streets.

Geography 
Yeremkino is located 23 km southwest of Sharan (the district's administrative centre) by road. Dyurtyuli is the nearest rural locality.

References 

Rural localities in Sharansky District